Cynthia is the debut album of freestyle music singer Cynthia, released 17 October 1990 by record label Micmac Records. The album includes the singles "Thief of Heart", "Endless Night" and "Change on Me", the latter reaching No. 37 on the Billboard Hot Dance Music/Club Play chart.

Track listing

Charts
Singles – Billboard

References

1990 debut albums
Cynthia (singer) albums